The Philippine National Police Lady Patrollers is the name of the official women's volleyball team of the Philippine National Police that competes in the Shakey's V-League. The team is composed of policewomen and civilian guest players.

As part of its sports development and police-community relations advocacy, the PNP established a women's volleyball team that competed in the 2013 (10th) Shakey’s V-League Open Conference Tournament held in San Juan Sports Arena, San Juan City last August 18 to October 22, 2013. The first PNP Women Volleyball team was formed through the Center for Police Strategy Management (CPSM). They were called the “PNP Lady P.A.T.R.O.L.ers” in relation to the call agenda of the PNP for transformation. The PNP joined the league to use broadcast media as a venue to promote the PNP P.A.T.R.O.L. Plan 2030 or the "Peace and Order Agenda for Transformation and upholding of the Rule-Of-Law" as its call agenda for countering unfavorable issues that is currently depicting the PNP. Police Chief Inspector (PCINSP) Ma. Angela M. Salaya of Information Technology Management Service, who was detailed as IT Officer of The CPSM is the Project Manager that formed the team. Then Police Senior Superintendent Manuel C. Gaerlan was tapped as the Team Manager and Bob Malenab was tasked to become the Team Coach. The 10th Open Conference was composed of different teams from Philippine Navy, Philippine Air Force, Philippine Army, Meralco, Smart- Maynilad, Cagayan Valley and Far Eastern University.  The team once again joined the league in 2014 (11th) Shakey's V-League Open Conference. 

In 2017, the PNP Lady P.A.T.R.O.L.ers Beach Volleyball Team composed of PO1 Karen Kay Quilario and PO1 Lourdilyn Catubag won the Gold Medal in the 2017 World Police and Fire Games last August 8-21, 2017 at Los Angeles California, USA besting formidable players of Russia, Germany, Canada and Brazil. The PNP Beach Volleyball Team was composed of PCSUPT Manuel R. Gaerlan (Team Manager) and PCINSP Ma. Angela M. Salaya (Project Manager) together with Team 2 PO1 Cassandra Ledda and PO1 Jessan Tano and Coaches SPO2 Dang Quiao and SPO2 Marilyn Mateo and Team Mentor PBGEN Noel A. Baraceros, Director, Center for Police Strategy Management. 

The team composed of players from Police Regional 11 also joined the 2019 World Police and Fire Games at Chengdu, China last August 5 -18, 2019 and placed 4th over-all behind teams from Brazil, China and Hong Kong.

Honors

Team

2013 Roster for the Shakey's V-League 10th Season Open Conference 
PNP PERSONNEL 
1.	SPO3 Jennifer S. Mia 
2.	SPO1 Ma. Ahleli D. Asuncion 
3.	PO1 Aidie L. Castro 
4.	PO1 Ma. Veronica Concepcion 
5.	NUP Maribeth Briones 
6.	NUP Jane D. Enguancho 

PNP Guest Players 
7.	Michelle Datuin 
8.	Ghileen Labrador 
9.	Kristine Ann A. Dave 
10.	Frances Xinia D. Molina 
11.	Janine Nicole L. Marciano 
12.	Melissa Kamille Ogana 
13.	Robey L. Remigio 
14.	Justyne Mae Tadeo 

Coaching Staff 
1.  PSSupt Manuel R. Gaerlan (Team Manager/Head Coach) 
2.  PCInsp Ma Angela M. Salaya (Project Manager) 
3.  Bob Malenab (Coach) 
4. PSI Ramonita B. Pajanostan (Asst Coach) 
5.  SPO1 Mechelle G. Guillermo Asst Coach)  

  
 for the Shakey's V-League 11th Season Open Conference

Coaching staff
 Head Coach: Argie Dave
 Assistant Coach(es): Ramonita Pajanostan

Team Staff
 Team Manager: Ysmael Yu
 Team Utility:

Medical Staff
 Team Physician: 
 Physical Therapist: 

2017 WORLD POLICE AND FIRE GAMES (LOS ANGELES, CALIFORNIA, USA) 
1. PBGen Manuel R Gaerlan - Team Manager 
2. PCInsp Ma. Angela M. Salaya - Project Manager 
3. PO1 Karen Kay Quilario 
4. PO1 Lourdilyn J. Catubag 
5. PO1 Cassandra E. Ledda 
6. PO1 Jessan I. Tano 
7. SPO2 Rosenda C. Quiao 
8. SPO2 Marilyn V. Mateo 

2019 WORLD POLICE AND FIRE GAMES PLAYERS (CHENGDU, CHINA) 
1. PltCol Ma. Angela M. Salaya - Project Manager 
2. PMSG Norine G Lapating 
3. PCPL Karen Kay Quilario 
4. PCPL Jessan E Tano 
5. PCPL Jennifer D Conde 	
6. PAT Helen T Antiquando 
7. PAT Charlotte Louise B Diaz   
8. PAT Laura Jay C Dimapilis 
9. PAT Floricel A Magsigay  
10. PAT Princess Joy A Oliveros 
11. PAT Johanna Marie C Pacunla  
12. PAT Lisl Camille C Vegafria

References

External links
 www.v-league.ph - Official website

P
2013 establishments in the Philippines
Volleyball clubs established in 2013
Women's volleyball teams in the Philippines